Sowbhagya Lakshmi is a 1987 Indian Kannada-language film, directed by  H. R. Bhargava and produced by S. P. Rajashekar. The film stars Vishnuvardhan, Lakshmi, Radha and Aruna. The film has musical score by S. P. Balasubrahmanyam. The film was a remake of the Telugu film Kartika Deepam.

Plot 
Chandru, on his wedding day, finds out that Sowbhagya is not his biological mother. Later, Chandru's father Shyam recalls his past to reveal the truth about Chandru's biological mother.

Cast

 Vishnuvardhan as Shyam and Chandru in dual role
 Lakshmi as Sowbhagya
 Radha as Lakshmi
 Aruna as Geetha
 Ramesh Bhat as Gundurao
 Umashree as Sundari, Gundurao's wife
 Ravishankar
 Thimmayya
 Bank Chandrashekar
 Shivaram in Guest Appearance
 Shivaprakash
 Master Amith
 Dayanand
 Sathyabhama
 Sowbhagya
 Sundaramma
 Mysore Sharada
 Shilpa
 Sarvamangala
 Sapna
 Seema
 Devikarani

Soundtrack 

The music was composed by S. P. Balasubrahmanyam.

Reception

References

External links
 
 

1987 films
1980s Kannada-language films
Kannada remakes of Telugu films
Films scored by S. P. Balasubrahmanyam
Films directed by H. R. Bhargava